Motorway 29 (A29) is a branch of the A2 (Egnatia Odos) motorway, connecting it with the city of Kastoria and the Greek–Albanian border crossing at Krystallopigi. As from July 2017, the motorway is fully operational after the completion of the 15 km part between Koromilia and Krystallopigi at 14/7/17.

Exit list

References

29
Roads in Western Macedonia